Frank Knight was a Canadian football player and coach who was the head coach of Toronto Argonauts from 1927-1928.

References

Sportspeople from Ontario
Toronto Argonauts players
Toronto Argonauts coaches
University of Toronto alumni
Year of birth missing
Year of death missing